Eachwick is a hamlet and former civil parish  from Morpeth, now in the parish of Stamfordham, in the county of Northumberland, England. In 1951 the parish had a population of 69.

History 
The name "Eachwick" is uncertain and may mean 'Oak-tree specialized-farm' or 'Aeca's specialized-farm'. Eachwick was formerly a township in Heddon-on-the-Wall parish, from 1866 Eachwick was a civil parish in its own right until it was abolished and merged to create Stamfordham on 1 April 1955. There are earthworks of Eachwick medieval village, that existed in AD 1296.

References

External links 

 

Hamlets in Northumberland
Former civil parishes in Northumberland
Stamfordham